West Sand Lake is a hamlet and census-designated place in Rensselaer County, New York, United States. The population was 2,845 people in 2015. The community is located in the northwestern corner of the town of Sand Lake.

Geography
West Sand Lake is located at  (42.644579, -73.605928).

Demographics

As of 2015, there were 2,845 people living in the town. The population density was 592.71 per square mile. The racial makeup of West Sand Lake was 95.8% Non Hispanic White, 0.2% African American, 0.08% Native American, .6 % Asian, and 1.5% from two or more races. Hispanic or Latino were 1.7% of the population. There were 907 households, out of which 38.0% had children under the age of 18 living with them, 63.2% were married couples living together, 9.2% had a female householder with no husband present, and 24.4% were non-families. 20.2% of all households were made up of individuals, and 9.7% had someone living alone who was 65 years of age or older. The average household size was 2.68 and the average family size was 3.09.

In the CDP, the population was spread out, with 26.8% under the age of 18, 5.9% from 18 to 24, 27.3% from 25 to 44, 28.7% from 45 to 64, and 11.3% who were 65 years of age or older. The median age was 39 years. For every 100 females, there were 93.7 males. For every 100 females age 18 and over, there were 91.9 males.

The median income for a household in West Sand Lake was $85,000, and the median income for a family was $92,367. The per capita income for the town was $36,235 About 5.0% of families and 7.8 of the population were below the poverty line, including 7.4% of those under age 18 and 19.1% of those age 65 or over.

The area has a population density of 592.71 people per sq. mile.

Notable people
 Douglas Marland, writer of daytime drama
 Edward W. Pattison, member of the United States House of Representatives 1975–1979

References

Census-designated places in New York (state)
Hamlets in New York (state)
Census-designated places in Rensselaer County, New York
Hamlets in Rensselaer County, New York